Ecséd is a small village in Heves County, Hungary.

Notable people 
 Gyula Pikler (1864-1937), philosopher of law
 Gedeon Richter (1872-1944), business magnate, investor, philanthropist, founder of the Gedeon Richter plc

References 

Populated places in Heves County